Yaari or Ya'ari is a Hebrew-language surname. 
Notable Israeli people with the surname include:

David Yaari (born 1969), American - Israeli entrepreneur, philanthropist, community organizer and activist
Ehud Yaari (born 1945), Israeli journalist
Meir Ya'ari (1897-1987), Israeli politician
Menahem Yaari (born 1935), Israeli economist
Sharon Yaari (born 1966),  Israeli photographer and educator
Yedidya Ya'ari (born 1947), Israeli Navy

See also

Hebrew-language surnames